Hovhannes Azoyan  (born September 28, 1982), is an Armenian actor and presenter. He is known for his roles as Manouk on Tnpesa,  Narek on Groom from the Circus, and Tigran on A Millionaire Wanted.

Since 2003, he has worked for Armenia TV company, where he has been the host or participant of "Out of the Game", "Healthy Lifestyle Club", "Good Morning, Armenians", "Yere1", "Los Armenios", "Good Night, Armenians" and "Azoyan's Evening" projects.

Filmography

References

External links 

About Hovhannes Azoyan
Page on kino-teatr.ru (Russian)

1967 births
Living people
Armenian male film actors
21st-century Armenian male actors
Armenian television presenters